Lokitanyala, Kenya is a settlement in the West Pokot County of Kenya. It sits across the international border from Lokitanyala, Uganda.

Location
The coordinates of Lokitanyala, Kenya are:2°21'49.0"N 34°55'26.0"E
(Latitude: 2.363611; Longitude: 34.923889).

Overview
Lokitanyala, Kenya is an important border crossing between Kenya and Uganda. Due to the poor state of roads on the Ugandan side, often vehicles have to cross into Kenya, then back into Uganda, while traveling between various Ugandan towns. This crossing is one of those used in intra-country and cross-border travel in this part of East Africa.

References

Populated places in West Pokot County
Kenya–Uganda border crossings